Auridae or Auridai was a deme of ancient Attica, originally of the phyle of Hippothontis, but later of the phyle of Antigonis, sending one delegate to the  Boule. 

Its site is unlocated, but probably in the Thriasian Plain.

References

Populated places in ancient Attica
Former populated places in Greece
Demoi
Lost ancient cities and towns